Not till Tomorrow is the 1972 album by British Folk musician Ralph McTell. Produced by Tony Visconti, it was McTell's fifth album to be released (aside from the remixed compilation Revisited) – and first album to chart – in the UK; and his third album to be released in the U.S. Ralph had been phoned and asked if he had decided on a title for the album and, wishing to give himself another day to come up with a title, responded "Not till tomorrow" which was misunderstood to be the name he had given to the album. By the time the mistake was found it was too late.

"Sylvia" was a tribute to Sylvia Plath and was recorded in a single take. "When I Was a Cowboy" used, in homage, the opening lines of Lead Belly's "Out on the Western Plains". "First Song" was the first song that McTell wrote the words first and "Barges" was the first tune that he could trace to another composer, Edvard Grieg in this instance.

Commercial performance 
Not till Tomorrow reached number 36 in the UK Album Chart soon after its release in November 1972.

Track listing 
All tracks composed by Ralph McTell.

Side One
 "Zimmerman Blues" – 3:50
 "First Song" – 2:39
 "When I Was a Cowboy" – 4:00
 "Nettle Wine" – 2:28
 "Sylvia" – 3:40
 "Birdman" – 6:10

Side Two
 "Barges" – 4:28
 "Standing Down in New York Town" – 3:58
 "Another Rain Has Fallen" – 3:57
 "This Time of Night" – 4:27
 "Gypsy" – 6:14

Personnel 
 Ralph McTell – guitar, piano, organ, harmonica, lead vocals
 Tony Visconti – sitar, organ, recorder, backing vocals
 Mary Hopkin – backing vocals (credited as Mary Visconti)
 Danny Thompson – double bass
 Laurie Allan – percussion

Production
Tony Visconti – producer
Alan Harris - engineer
Victor Gamm – recording engineer
Seabrook/Graves/Aslett – sleeve art direction
 Kelvin McGowan – photography

Release history

References 

Ralph McTell albums
1972 albums
Albums produced by Tony Visconti
Reprise Records albums